Julie Estelle Gasnier (born January 4, 1989) is an Indonesian actress and model best known internationally for her roles in slasher and martial arts films, such as Ladya in Macabre (2009), Hammer Girl in The Raid 2 (2014), and The Operator in The Night Comes for Us (2018). She won Best New Actress at the 2015 Jackie Chan Action Movie Awards.

Early life and education
Julie Estelle was born on January 4, 1989, in Jakarta, Indonesia, to an Indonesian mother and French-American father. Julie graduated from Lycee International Francais de Jakarta majoring in Business.

Career 
Julie debuted at 15 years old in the 2005 romance film Alexandria, taking on the role of a 20 year-old college senior. For her acting in this film, Julie won the 2006 MTV Indonesia Awards "Most Favorite Rising Star". In 2006, Estelle starred in a blockbuster horror film Kuntilanak (The Chanting) and its two spin-offs in 2007 and 2008, respectively. She was featured on the cover of Playboy Magazine's Indonesian edition for July 2006 issue, right after she turned 17.

In 2010, Julie dipped into her first action film genre in The Mo Brothers' mega blockbuster slasher film Macabre. The following years, Julie played in numerous local TV series and movies. At 20 years old, Julie was the seventh-highest paid actress in Indonesia. In addition to modelling career, she also appeared in several music videos.

In 2012, she joined Gareth Evans' action film The Raid 2. She was cast as Hammer Girl, a merciless assassin who uses claw hammers as her signature weapon and is proficient in Silat Harimau. Evans was impressed with her audition and cast her despite her lack of martial arts background. For the role of Hammer Girl, Julie learned pencak silat from Yayan Ruhian, the co-choreographer of the film.

In 2014, Julie attended Sundance Film Festival for The Raid 2s world premiere. Justin Chang of Variety wrote that her character "feel[s] straight out of the Tarantino playbook, particularly in a climactic endgame whose red-walled production design seems to be channeling Only God Forgives."

For her performance in The Raid 2, Julie received the Best New Actress award at Jackie Chan Action Movie Awards at The 2015 Shanghai International Film Festival.

In 2016, Julie reunited with Iko Uwais and Mo Brothers of Macabre for the action thriller Headshot. The same year, Julie starred in the drama Letters from Prague as a woman trying to fulfill her deceased mother's last wish. The film was selected as the Indonesian entry for the Best Foreign Language Film at the 89th Academy Awards.

Julie played The Operator in Timo Tjahjanto's 2018 action film The Night Comes for Us. The film premiered at Fantastic Fest on 22 September 2018, and was distributed by Netflix. Kieran Fisher of Film School Rejects wrote, "Her role was that of a background player, but she certainly made a memorable impression and further proved that she could get mix it up with the best of them", and "The actress boasts such a commanding screen presence and effortlessly compelling aura that she could become a household name in the West if she picks the right roles."

In November 2018, Julie joined ICM Partners as her representative agency in the U.S. The following month, she was cast to play the leader of rebels in an American-Indonesian joint production action film Foxtrot Six. The film was released in late February 2019. The Jakarta Post praised her performance in the film, "She is the best performer of the film as she rarely comes off as awkward even when delivering the film’s forced dialog and her character also being the most interesting."

Personal life 
Julie is the second daughter out of three sisters. Her elder sister, Catherine Sharon Gasnier, is a TV host and actress.

On 25 February 2021, Julie married a racer, David Tjiptobiantoro, in Maldives.

Filmography

Film

Television series

Music video

Awards and nominations

References

External links

1989 births
Indo people
Indonesian film actresses
Actresses from Jakarta
Indonesian Christians
Living people
Minahasa people
Indonesian people of Chinese descent
Indonesian people of French descent
Indonesian people of American descent
21st-century Indonesian actresses